The "fastest" train commercial service can be defined alternatively by a train's top speed or average trip speed.

 The fastest train service measured by peak operational speed is the Shanghai maglev train which can reach . Due to the limited length of the Shanghai Maglev track (30 km)(18.6 mi), the maglev train's average trip speed is only .
 The fastest train service measured by average trip speed from 2009 until 2011 was on the Wuhan–Guangzhou high-speed railway, where from December 2009 until July 1, 2011, the CRH3/CRH2 coupled-train sets averaged  on the  route from Wuhan to Guangzhou North.
 350 km/h operation was restored in late 2017 with the introduction of Fuxing Hao trains for services running on the Beijing–Shanghai high-speed railway in late 2017 making the CRH network once again having the fastest operating speed in the world. Several services to complete the  journey between Shanghai Hongqiao and Beijing South in 4 hours and 24 min or with an average speed of  making it the fastest train service measured by average trip speed in the world.
In 2019, the fastest timetabled start-to-stop runs between a station pair in the world are trains G17/G39 on the Beijing–Shanghai high-speed railway averaging  running non-stop between Beijing South to Nanjing South before continuing to other destinations.

Speed records of China's rolling stock (non-maglev)

Notes

References